The Nicola Valley Museum and Archives is in Merritt, British Columbia.  it was built and is operated by the Nicola Valley Museum and Archives Association, which was formed at a meeting at Merritt City Hall on May 26, 1976, and was registered as a Society on September 23, 1976. The members initially met in a variety of locations and had two temporary museums before moving into the current facility in 1980/81.  The 4,000 square foot (372 square metre) museum/archives shares a building with a Senior Citizens Recreation Centre.  It is located in downtown Merritt at 1675 Tutill Court with access from Coldwater Avenue or from the adjacent Railyard Mall.

Collection
The museum collects information and artifacts from all over the Nicola Valley.  The archives has a wide variety of historical reference material including local newspapers dating back to the early 1900s and over 4,000 historical photographs. The association has been publishing a "Historical Quarterly" since December, 1977.

Publication
Association members were also the main contributors to the book "Merritt & the Nicola Valley: An Illustrated History"  The current president is Murphy Shewchuk.

Affiliations
The Museum is affiliated with: CMA,  CHIN, and Virtual Museum of Canada.

See also
Merritt, British Columbia

References

External links
Nicola Valley Museum and Archive (2007)

Museums in British Columbia
Nicola Country
History of British Columbia
History museums in British Columbia
Archives in Canada